James Camp Tappan (September 9, 1825 – March 19, 1906) was an American lawyer from Helena who served as the 31st speaker of the Arkansas House of Representatives from 1897 to 1899. A member of the Democratic Party, Tappan previously served as an Arkansas state representative from Phillips County (1850–1852 and 1897–1901). He also served as a senior officer of the Confederate States Army in the Western and Trans-Mississippi theaters of the American Civil War.

Early life and education 
James Camp Tappan was born in Franklin, Tennessee, where his parents had migrated from Newburyport, Massachusetts. He attended Phillips Exeter Academy in Exeter, New Hampshire, and graduated from Yale University in 1845. He studied law at Vicksburg, Mississippi, and was admitted to the bar in 1846. He soon moved to Helena, Arkansas. He was elected to two non-consecutive terms in the Arkansas House of Representatives and also served as a circuit court judge.

American Civil War 
At the outbreak of the American Civil War, Tappan's sympathies lay with the Confederate cause (despite his Northern parents), and he joined the Confederate army. In May 1861 he received a commission as Colonel of the 13th Arkansas Infantry. He commanded his regiment at the Battle of Belmont and made repeated charges on the "Hornet's Nest" at the Battle of Shiloh. After Shiloh, he took part in the Kentucky Campaign and fought at the battles of Richmond and Perryville.

On November 5, 1862, Tappan received his commission as a brigadier-general and was transferred to the Trans-Mississippi Department under Major-General Sterling Price. He commanded his brigade at the Battle of Pleasant Hill, defending against Maj. Gen. Nathaniel Banks' Red River Campaign of 1864. His brigade was moved northward back into Arkansas to meet Major-General Frederick Steele at the Battle of Jenkins' Ferry. He also took part in Price's Missouri Expedition.

Later life 

After the war, Tappan returned to Helena, Arkansas, and resumed his law practice, where he established himself as the dean of the Arkansas bar. He also engaged in politics after the Reconstruction period and served again in the Arkansas legislature. Tappan was nominated by the Democratic party for Governor of Arkansas on two occasions but declined to run. He died on March 19, 1906, at Helena and was buried at Maple Hill Cemetery near the graves of Confederate generals Thomas C. Hindman and Patrick Cleburne.

The James C. Tappan House was listed on the U.S. National Register of Historic Places on June 4, 1973.

See also  
 List of Confederate generals
 List of people from Tennessee
 List of Phillips Exeter Academy people
 List of speakers of the Arkansas House of Representatives
 List of Yale University people

References

Sources 

 Eicher, John H., and David J. Eicher, Civil War High Commands. Stanford: Stanford University Press, 2001. .
 Sifakis, Stewart. Who Was Who in the Civil War. New York: Facts On File, 1988. .
 Warner, Ezra J. Generals in Gray: Lives of the Confederate Commanders. Baton Rouge: Louisiana State University Press, 1959. .

External links

 
 James Camp Tappan at The Historical Marker Database (HMdb.org)
 James Camp Tappan at The Political Graveyard
 

1825 births
1906 deaths
19th-century American Episcopalians
19th-century American judges
19th-century American lawyers
19th-century American politicians
American lawyers admitted to the practice of law by reading law
Arkansas lawyers
Burials in Arkansas
Confederate States Army brigadier generals
Deaths in Arkansas
Farmers from Arkansas
People from Coahoma County, Mississippi
People from Franklin, Tennessee
People from Helena, Arkansas
People of Arkansas in the American Civil War
Phillips Exeter Academy alumni
Schoolteachers from Mississippi
Speakers of the Arkansas House of Representatives
Democratic Party members of the Arkansas House of Representatives
Yale University alumni
19th-century American educators